Roger Thomas (born 17 April 1973 in Jamaica) is a Jamaican retired footballer.

Career

At the age of 13, a teacher asked Thomas "what he was going to do with his life besides play soccer", which inspired him to do well in school. As a result, Thomas left Jamaica after high school to attend college in the United States.

After training with Chilean side Club Deportivo Universidad Católica, he signed for Miami Fusion in the American top flight.

References

Jamaican footballers
Association football midfielders
1973 births
Living people
Association football forwards
Miami Fusion players
Major League Soccer players